The Billings Outlaws were a professional league indoor football team based in Billings, Montana. They were a member of the Indoor Football League (IFL), of which they were the 2-time defending champions. They played their home games at Rimrock Auto Arena at MetraPark. Their games were broadcast live locally on News Talk 910 KBLG AM and online through Teamline.

Seasons

2000–2001 seasons
The team originally began play as a 2000 expansion member of the Indoor Football League as the Billings Thunderbolts.  Despite a winning record of 8-6, it was not enough to make the playoffs. When the league folded, they became a charter member of the National Indoor Football League in 2001 and became the Billings Outlaws until the 2005 season when they were the Billings Mavericks and the start of the 2006 season, when a naming dispute with the Osceola Outlaws led to the NIFL stripping both teams of the Outlaws name.
However, as of June 11, 2006, the NIFL recognized Billings as the Outlaws again.

2002 season

The Outlaws first year in the playoffs. Many people thought it would be unexpected of Billings to make it all the way to the championship especially after coming in second in their division but they did so and proved many wrong. It was not easy, as Bismarck was in for a fight. Both games were decided in the final minute, in which Outlaws prevailed.
The championship game was the same other than the difference that the Ohio Valley Greyhounds took home the win and proved to be the best team winning 55-52 and pulling out an overall record that year of 15-1 while the Outlaws finished the season with an overall record of 12-5.

2003–2005 season

The Outlaws played hard but fell short of a .500 plus record and missed out on the playoffs in 2003. In 2004, the Billings squad dominated their way to a record of 11-3. But, the Outlaws would be triumphed in Sioux Falls in the Conference Semi-Finals. After a great year, the Billings Outlaws became the Billings Mavericks. This fell into place when the Osceola Outlaws joined the NIFL. The two teams disputed over who should be named the Outlaws. The league commissioner decided to strip both teams of the name and make each team pick a new one for the 2005 season. The Mavericks became the new team to cheer for, but they came to the end of their worst season in this franchises ten-year history. They fell to 5-9 on the season but managed to make the playoffs. They played the Everett Hawks in Washington. As the underdog, some players saw a miracle on the horizon. But, the happy ending was cut short. The Mavericks held strong in the end but lost by a disheartening three points and Everett moved on to the next round of the playoffs.

2006 season

The 2006 season was a success as the Outlaws were handed only one loss in Week 2 to Tri-Cities Fever but then redeemed themselves by beating Tri-Cities three times that same year including a win in the playoffs. After defeating Tri-Cities in the first round, the Outlaws took down their league rival the Rapid City Flying Aces in a high intensity game that came down to the end. The Outlaws then hosted the NIFL Indoor Bowl VI on July 28, 2006 in front of a sold out MetraPark and beat the Fayetteville Guard 59-44 in an offensive showcase.

2007 season

After the 2006 season, the Outlaws announced they were joining United Indoor Football for the 2007 season.  The first season for the Outlaws in the UIF started out terrible as they fell to 0-4. Soon after, they became a team to fear as the Outlaws finished off the final ten games going 8-2. Even with all the confidence and momentum they could not hold up against the Sioux Falls Storm in the second round of the playoffs.

2008 season

The 2008 season was a more exciting and successful year but yet again the Outlaws would lose to Sioux Falls in the Western Conference Finals but this game was more heart pounding as the Billings Outlaws held a lead of 44-43 but with less tham 5 seconds left in the game Sioux Falls kicker Adam Hicks booted a 45-yard field goal through the uprights as the clock expired to claim a 46-44 win. The Outlaws were very frustrated after the game and had reasons. The Outlaws kicker went 1 of 4 on field goals in the Billings loss. Billings had lost two games earlier that season because of their horrid kicking game. After the end of the 2008 season they became members of the Indoor Football League through the UIF's merger with the Intense Football League.

2009 season

During the 2009 season the Outlaws had played tough and received two losses which came at the Omaha Civic Auditorium against the Omaha Beef. The second loss was very controversial as the Outlaws came on the field to tie the game up with one second remaining, but an Outlaws player was injured, requiring ten seconds to be run off the clock resulting in a 48-45 victory for the Beef. The Outlaws had won seven in a row until that loss but on the streak it included three wins against the four time defending UIF champion Sioux Falls Storm with scores of 42-41, 70-35, and 34-22. The last of these games was in Sioux Falls and snapped the Storm's 35 home-game win streak. The Outlaws then were considered the best team in the league and proved it against the RiverCity Rage by defeating them in the United Bowl 71-62 in front of a near capacity crowd of 8,351.

2010 season

Kicking off the season at home, the Outlaws had a brutal win over Kent, one of the new league franchises. Not long after the win, the Outlaws suffered a loss on a no-call on pass interference, this left Sioux Falls victorious and the Outlaws dumbfounded with 1 in the loss column, and the second and last loss was controversial because the Outlaws were called for three penalties in the final minute of the game to which Fairbanks countered with a last second score to win 55-54. The Outlaws rebounded after the loss with a scoring onslaught to defeat the Tri-Cities Fever twice, the Kent Predators once,  the San Angelo Stampede Express once, the Arkansas Diamonds once, and the Sioux Falls Storm twice. The Outlaws again won the United Bowl, this time over long-time rival Sioux Falls by a score of 43-34 on July 17, 2010 in front of a packed house in the Sportsplex. The original home of the Outlaws, the Metrapark was heavily damaged by an F2 tornado following their last game of the regular season.

Team ceases operations
On October 7, 2010 the Outlaws announced they would cease operations due to not having enough money for the 2011 season, this was in large part due to a disagreement with county commissioners over funding non-insured losses suffered during the 2010 tornado that severely damaged the Rimrock Auto Arena. Indoor football would return to Billings five years later when the IFL awarded Billings an expansion franchise, the Billings Wolves. The Wolves were coached in their first year by former Outlaws quarterback Chris Dixon who had gone on to win three more IFL titles with the Sioux Falls Storm following his consecutive titles in 2009 and 2010 with the Outlaws.

Training facility

A training facility costing around $3 million was built for the Outlaws and opened in March 2007. A facility of this nature is unprecedented in any indoor or arena league other than the Arena Football League.  Photos of this facility can be found here.  The facility is called the Outlaws Community SportsPlex. This facility has been used for many events and purposes such as practice, fundraisers, birthday parties, Montana State University Billings' Inter-Tribal Indian Club's Powwow, try-outs, and much more.

Schedules

2009 schedule

Coaching staff

Head Coach- Heron O'Neal

Offensive Line- Artavious Williams

Statistics
playoffs not included

Passing leaders

Receiving leaders

Rushing leaders

Interception leaders

Sack leaders

Rivals
playoffs not included

Championship scores

Season-by-season

|-
| colspan="6" align="center" bgcolor="#FFD12A" | Billings Thunderbolts (Indoor Football League)
|-
|2000 || 8 || 6 || 0 || 4th WC Northern || --
|-
| colspan="6" align="center" bgcolor="#104E8B" | Billings Outlaws (National Indoor Football League) 
|-
|2001 || 7 || 7 || 0 || 4th League Central || --
|-
|2002 || 12 || 5 || 0 || 2nd Pacific West || Won Round 1 (Lincoln Capitols)Won Conference Championship (Bismarck Roughriders)Lost Indoor Bowl II (Ohio Valley Greyhounds)
|-
|2003 || 6 || 8 || 0 || 5th Pacific West || --
|-
|2004 || 12 || 4 || 0 || 1st Pacific West || Won Pacific Semi-Final (Omaha Beef)Lost Pacific Conference Championship (Sioux Falls Storm)
|-
| colspan="6" align="center" bgcolor="#FFD12A" | Billings Mavericks (National Indoor Football League)
|-
|2005 || 5 || 10 || 0 || 3rd Pacific West || Lost Pacific Quarterfinal (Everett Hawks)
|-
| colspan="6" align="center" bgcolor="#104E8B" | Billings Outlaws (National Indoor Football League)
|-
|2006 || 16 || 1 || 0 || 1st Pacific North || Won Pacific Semi-Final (Tri-Cities Fever)Won Pacific Conference Championship (Rapid City Flying Aces)Won Indoor Bowl VI (Fayetteville Guard)
|-
| colspan="6" align="center" bgcolor="#104E8B" | Billings Outlaws (United Indoor Football)
|-
|2007 || 9 || 7 || 0 || 2nd West || Won Round 1 (Omaha Beef)Lost Western Championship (Sioux Falls Storm)
|-
|2008 || 11 || 5 || 0 || 2nd West || Won Round 1 (Omaha Beef)Lost Western Championship (Sioux Falls Storm)
|-
| colspan="6" align="center" bgcolor="#104E8B" | Billings Outlaws (Indoor Football League)
|-
|2009 || 15 || 2 || 0 || 1st Intense Pacific || Won Pacific Divisional Championship (Fairbanks Grizzlies)Won Instense Conference Championship (El Paso Generals)Won 2009 United Bowl (RiverCity Rage)
|-
|2010 || 16 || 2 || 0 || 1st Pacific North  || Won Round 1 (Tri-Cities Fever) Won Conference Semi-Final (San Angelo Stampede) Won Intense Conference Championship (Arkansas Diamonds) Won 2010 United Bowl (Sioux Falls Storm)
|-
!Total || 104 || 41 || 0
|colspan="2"| (Regular season and playoffs) Billings Outlaws
|-
!Total || 117 || 57 || 0
|colspan="2"| (Regular season and playoffs) Billings Outlaws/Thunderbolts/Mavericks

References

External links
 Official site
 Outlaws' 2007 stats
 Outlaws' 2008 stats

 
2001 establishments in Montana
2004 disestablishments in Montana
2006 establishments in Montana
2010 disestablishments in Montana